Boris Anfiyanovich Shakhlin (27 January 1932 – 30 May 2008) was a Soviet gymnast who was the 1960 Olympic all-around champion and the 1958 all-around World Champion. He won a total of 13 medals including seven gold medals at the Summer Olympics, and was the most successful athlete at the 1960 Summer Olympics. He held the record for most Olympic medals by a male athlete record until gymnast Nikolai Andrianov won his 14th and 15th medals at the 1980 Summer Olympics. He also won 14 medals at the World Championships.

Career
Shakhlin was born in Ishim, Russian SFSR. He began gymnastics at the age of 12. According to the Encyclopædia Britannica, he "set a career record of 10 individual titles in the world championships and also won gold medals at three successive Olympic Games. His tally of seven gold, four silver, and two bronze Olympic medals placed him among the most-decorated at the Games".

Shakhlin retired from competition at the age of 35 after suffering a heart attack. He joined the FIG Men's Technical Committee in 1968 and continued to work on the Committee until 1992. In the 1990s and 2000s (decade), he worked as a lecturer at the University of Kyiv.

He was awarded the Red Banner of Labor in 1956 and the Order of Lenin in 1960. He was named an honorary citizen both in his birth town Ishim and in Kyiv where lived for many years. In 2002, he was inducted into the International Gymnastics Hall of Fame.

He died on 30 May 2008.

Philatelia 
The Mongol Post issued a postage stamp - Boris Shakhlin (№525, 1969).

See also

List of multiple Olympic gold medalists
List of multiple Olympic gold medalists at a single Games
List of multiple Summer Olympic medalists
List of Olympic medal leaders in men's gymnastics

References

External links

List of competition results at Gymn Forum

|-

|-

|-

1932 births
2008 deaths
People from Ishim, Tyumen Oblast
Russian male artistic gymnasts
Soviet male artistic gymnasts
Ukrainian male artistic gymnasts
Olympic gymnasts of the Soviet Union
Olympic gold medalists for the Soviet Union
Olympic silver medalists for the Soviet Union
Olympic bronze medalists for the Soviet Union
Olympic medalists in gymnastics
Gymnasts at the 1956 Summer Olympics
Gymnasts at the 1960 Summer Olympics
Gymnasts at the 1964 Summer Olympics
World champion gymnasts
Medalists at the World Artistic Gymnastics Championships
Burevestnik (sports society) athletes
Medalists at the 1964 Summer Olympics
Medalists at the 1960 Summer Olympics
Medalists at the 1956 Summer Olympics
Burials at Baikove Cemetery
European champions in gymnastics
Sportspeople from Tyumen Oblast